B'nai Jeshurun is a synagogue on the Upper West Side of Manhattan, New York City.

History
Founded in 1825, Bnai Jeshurun was the second synagogue founded in New York and the third-oldest Ashkenazi synagogue in the United States.

The synagogue was founded by a coalition of young members of Congregation Shearith Israel, immigrants, and the descendants of immigrants from the German and Polish lands. It was the stated intention to follow the "German and Polish minhag (rite)." The order of prayers followed that of the Ashkenazi Great Synagogue of London, and the congregation sought the guidance of the British chief Rabbi Solomon Hirschell on matters of ritual. They first held services on Pearl Street, and dedicated their first building on Elm Street in Manhattan in 1829.

The first rabbi, Samuel Myer Isaacs, was appointed in 1839. In 1845, a schism formed in the congregation leadership. By 1850, the congregation had grown large enough to make it necessary to build a new synagogue. A building on Greene Street was dedicated on September 25, 1851, and the Jewish newspaper Asmonean described the edifice and its builders as admirable. Its rabbi in the 1850s and 1860s, when it was frequently called "the Greene Street Synagogue", was Morris Jacob Raphall. By 1852, it had started a Hebrew school open to the entire city's Jews, of all varieties, and by 1854 had opened a separate school building a few doors down Greene Street.

B'nai Jeshurun had a cemetery on 32nd Street, which was in use until 1851, when the city banned burials in the area. At that time, they jointly created a cemetery named Beth Olom in Cypress Hills, Brooklyn, but continued to maintain the older cemetery. By 1875, the Manhattan cemetery was becoming derelict, and the congregation sold it to developers in 1875, moving those buried there to its new cemetery. The old location is now occupied by the back portion of the Hotel Pennsylvania, approximately where the loading dock and sports club entrance are situated.

In 1864, the congregation moved yet again, to a new building on 34th Street, the parcel later became part of the site of the flagship Macy's store. Driven by the rapid expansion of the city, they moved yet again in the spring of 1885 to Madison Avenue at 65th Street. That building was designed by Rafael Guastavino and Schwarzmann & Buchman. Less than a year later, a fire did extensive damage to the building. Reports rated the damage at $35,000. B'nai Jeshurun was temporarily relocated to Congregation Ahawath Chesed, now Central Synagogue, on Lexington Avenue, which ironically had a fire of its own within the month, leaving both congregations homeless.

Henry Jacobs was another long-serving rabbi. He had a 17-year tenure, ending in January, 1893.

The present building, located at 257 West 88th Street, between Broadway and West End Avenue, was dedicated in 1917. It was designed by Henry B. Herts, a congregant and celebrated theater architect, with Walter S. Schneider. In addition to its place on the National Register of Historic Places, the synagogue was included in the New York City Riverside Drive-West End Historic District created in 1990. The muqarna-studded ceiling was redesigned following its collapse during renovations in the early 1990s and was replaced with a future-invoking space frame back-lit to simulate a nighttime sky

Breakaway congregations
B'nai Jeshurun's original founders broke from the city's only synagogue, Shearith Israel, in 1825, in order to create an Ashkenazi congregation. Subsequently, B'nai Jeshurun members broke away to form new synagogues several times.

In 1828, at a time of rapid growth in the New York Jewish community, a group left B'nai Jeshurun to found Ansche Chesed.

In 1845, Temple Shaaray Tefila was founded by 50 primarily English and Dutch Jews who had been members of B'nai Jeshurun.

Affiliation
B'nai Jeshurun took a leading role in founding the Board of Directors of American Israelites in 1859. By 1874, there were divisions within the congregation over remaining strictly Orthodox or adopting ideas from the Reform movement, and by 1875, it was in litigation, with the Reform movement ultimately winning in court. The Board of Delegates affiliated with the Reform movement's Union of American Hebrew Congregations in 1878, but in 1884 it left. Two years later, it also supported the founding of the Jewish Theological Seminary of America (JTS) in 1886, a school formed to support Orthodoxy in combating the Reform movement.

In 1870, it worked with the other Conservative (non-Reform) synagogues of the city to develop a uniform siddur. In 1889, the congregation published its own edition of the prayer book.

When Solomon Schechter used the Jewish Theological Seminary to create a conservative set of reforms to traditional Judaism, B'nai Jeshurun joined his United Synagogue of America, now the United Synagogue of Conservative Judaism. In the late 1980s the congregation left the Conservative movement and became independent.

Contemporary
A spiritual and demographic renaissance began in 1985, with the arrival of Rabbi Marshall Meyer. At the same time, the congregation introduced musical Shabbat services that drew from both Sephardic and Chassidic musical traditions.

A "Stonewall Shabbat Seder" was first held at B’nai Jeshurun in 1995. In 2018, B'nai Jeshurun announced its decision to officiate interfaith marriages if the couple promised to raise their children as Jews, exclusively.

Notable clergy
 Rabbi Samuel Myer Isaacs (1804-1878)
 Rabbi Stephen Samuel Wise (1893-1900)
 Rabbi Joseph Mayor Asher (1901-1907)
 Rabbi Judah Leon Magnes (1911-1912)
 Rabbi Israel Goldstein (1918-1960)
 Rabbi William Berkowitz (1950-1984)
 Rabbi Marshall Meyer (1985-1993)
 Rabbi J. Rolando Matalon (1986-)
 Rabbi Felicia Sol (2001-)

References
https://www.newspapers.com/clip/18691599/funerals_yesterday/

External links

 B'nai Jeshurun website

Ashkenazi synagogues
German-Jewish culture in New York City
Polish-Jewish culture in New York City
Synagogues completed in 1917
Synagogues in Manhattan
Upper West Side
Properties of religious function on the National Register of Historic Places in Manhattan
Byzantine Revival synagogues
Unaffiliated synagogues in New York City
Synagogues on the National Register of Historic Places in New York City